The yellow-and-black triplefin, Forsterygion flavonigrum, a triplefin of the genus Forsterygion, is found around the north of the North Island of New Zealand at depths of between 15 and 30 m, in reef areas of broken rock. Its length is between 4 and 7 cm.

Its non-breeding colouration is a pale pinkish head with a yellowish body and tail, with a black mask across the eyes which continues in a stripe down the centre of the body gradually changing to a darker yellow.

The breeding colouration is spectacular - the head and tail become black, while the rest of the body becomes bright yellow.  Yellow-and-black triplefins guard their nest.  After spawning the non-breeding colours rapidly return.

References

 
 Tony Ayling & Geoffrey Cox, Collins Guide to the Sea Fishes of New Zealand,  (William Collins Publishers Ltd, Auckland, New Zealand 1982) 

Yellow-and-black triplefin
Endemic marine fish of New Zealand
Fish described in 1994
Taxa named by Ronald Fricke